The subfamily Mormyrinae contains all but one of the genera of the African freshwater fish family Mormyridae  in the order Osteoglossiformes. They are often called  elephantfish  due to a long protrusion below their mouths used to detect buried invertebrates that is suggestive of a tusk or trunk (some such as Marcusenius senegalensis gracilis are sometimes called trunkfish though this term is usually associated with an unrelated group of fish). They can also be called tapirfish.

Fish in this subfamily have a high brain to body mass ratio due to an expanded cerebellum (called a gigantocerebellum) used in their electroperception. Linked to this they are notable for holding the zoological record at around 60% as the brains that consume the most energy as a percentage of the body's metabolic rate of any animal.  Previous to this discovery, it was the “human brain, which had been thought to hold the record in this respect”.p. 605 The human brain in comparison uses only 20%.

Mormyrinae is the largest subfamily in the Osteoglossiformes order with around 170 species.

Unique brain percentage of body energy consumption
The range with which the adult brain in all animals regardless of body size consumes energy as a percentage of the body's energy is roughly 2% to 8%.  The only exceptions of animal brains using more than 10% (in terms of O2 intake) are a few  primates (11–13%) and humans. However, research published in 1996 in The Journal of Experimental Biology by Göran Nilsson  at Uppsala University found that mormyrinae brains utilize roughly 60% of their body O2 consumption. This is due to the combination of large brain size (3.1% of body mass compared to 2% in humans) and them being ectothermic.

The body energy expenditure of ectothermic animals  is  about 1/13 of that of endotherms  but the energy expenditure of the brains of both ectothermic and endothermic animals are  similar. Other high brain percentage  (2.6–3.7 % of the body mass) animals exist such as  bats, swallows, crows and sparrows but these due to their endothermy also have high body energy metabolism. The unusual high brain energy consumption percentage of mormyrinae fish is thus due to them having the unusual combination of a large brain in a low energy consuming body. The actual energy consumption per unit mass of its brain is not in fact particularly high and indeed lower (2.02 mg g1 h1) than that in some other fish such as  Salmonidae (2.20 mg g−1 h−1).  In comparison, that of rats is 6.02 mg g−1 h−1 and humans 2.61 mg g−1 h−1.Table 1
 
The oxygen for this in low oxygen conditions comes from gulping air at the water surface.

Large brains
Unlike mammals, the part of the brain enlarged in mormyrinae fish is the cerebellum not the cerebrum and reflecting this is called a gigantocerebellum. This enlarged cerebellum  links to their electroreception. They generate weak electrical fields from specialized electric organ muscles. To detect these fields from those created by other mormyrinae fish, their prey animals, and how their nearby environment distorts them, their skin contains three types of electroreceptors. The electroperception they enable is used in hunting prey, electrolocation, and communication (Knollenorgans are the specialized electrical detection organs for this function). This electroperception, however, requires complex information processing in special neurocircuitry since it is dependent upon the ability to distinguish between self-generated and other generated electric fields, and their self-created aspects  and their environment modification. To enable this specialized information processing, with each self-generated electrical discharge, an efference copy of it is made for comparison with the detected electric field it creates. The cerebellum plays a key role in processing such efference copy dependent perception. The muddy waters where they live has resulted in such electroperception playing a key role in their survival and this has resulted in their gigantocerebellum.

Classification
The classification by osteology-based traits of Mormyridae into the two subfamilies of Mormyrinae and Petrocephalinae has been confirmed using molecular phylogeny methods.

 Subfamily Mormyrinae
 Boulengeromyrus Taverne & Géry, 1968
Brevimyrus Taverne, 1971
 Brienomyrus Taverne, 1971
 Campylomormyrus Bleeker, 1874
 Cyphomyrus Pappenheim, 1906
 Genyomyrus Boulenger, 1898
 Gnathonemus Gill, 1863
 Heteromormyrus Steindachner, 1866
 Hippopotamyrus Pappenheim, 1906
 Hyperopisus Gill, 1862
 Isichthys Gill, 1863
 Ivindomyrus Taverne & Géry, 1975
 Marcusenius Gill, 1862
 Mormyrops J. P. Müller, 1843
 Mormyrus Linnaeus, 1758
 Myomyrus Boulenger, 1898
 Oxymormyrus Bleeker, 1874
 Paramormyrops Taverne, Thys van den audenaerde& Heymer, 1977
 Pollimyrus Taverne, 1971
 Stomatorhinus Boulenger, 1898

See also 
 Medjed (fish) — worshipped elephantfish in Ancient Egypt.

References

Mormyridae
Fish of Africa
Ray-finned fish subfamilies